The 1906 Oregon Agricultural Aggies football team represented Oregon Agricultural College (now known as Oregon State University) as an independent during the 1906 college football season. In their first season under head coach Fred Norcross, the Aggies compiled a 4–1–2 record, held six of seven opponents scoreless, and outscored their opponents by a combined total of 78 to 4. The Aggies played to scoreless ties against Oregon and Washington and lost to Willamette (0–4). Herb Root was the team captain.

Schedule

References

Oregon Agricultural
Oregon State Beavers football seasons
Oregon Agricultural Aggies football